Ashta Pradhan (literally, Modern council of ministers) was a system of ministerial delegation in Maratha empire. The council is credited with having implemented good governance practices in the Maratha heartland, as well as for the success of the military campaigns against the Mughal Empire.

Constitution 
The coronation of Chhatrapati Shivaji was held in 1674, at the fort of Raigad in present-day Indian state of Maharashtra. On that occasion, Chatrapati Shivaji formalized the institution of a council of eight ministers to guide the administration of his nascent state. This council came to be known as the Ashta Pradhan. Each of the ministers was placed in charge of an administrative department; thus, the council heralded the birth of a bureaucracy.

The formalization of an administrative mechanism was of a piece with other measures, indicative of the formalization of a sovereign state, which were implemented on the occasion of Chatrapati Shivaji's coronation: coinage bearing his insignia (the copper Shivrai and the gold hon) were issued, and a new era, the Rajyabhishek era, was proclaimed on the occasion.

Composition 

The Ashta Pradhan was designed to encompass all the primary administrative functions of the state, with each minister being given charge of one role in the administration. Ministerial designations were drawn from the Sanskrit language; the eight ministerial roles were as follows:

Pantpradhan or Peshwa - Prime Minister, general administration of the Empire. Moropant Trimbak Pingle was the first Peshwa appointed by Chhatrapati Shivaji.
Amatya or Mazumdar - Finance Minister, managing accounts of the Empire. In 1662 Nilo Sondeo was appointed as Mazumdar. In 1674, at the Coronation ceremony, the post Mujumdar was renamed as Amatya and the title was solely bestowed Ramchandra Pant Amatya. 
Shurunavis/Sacheev - Secretary, preparing royal edicts. In 1662 Annaji Datto was appointed as Shurnavis/Sacheev.
Waqia-Navis - Interior Minister, managing internal affairs especially intelligence and espionage.
Sar-i-Naubat or Senapati - Commander-in-Chief, managing the forces and defence of the Empire. Netaji Palkar was appointed as the first Senapati. Most famous Senapati in that era was Hambirrao Mohite.
Sumant/Dabir - Foreign Minister, to manage relationships with other sovereigns. First Dubeer was Sonopant Vishwanath Dubeer who was sent by Shahaji  to help Chatrapati Shivaji Maharaj and Jijabai in Pune region. After Sonopant, his son Traymbak Sono Dubeer was appointed as Dubeer and after him, his son Ramchandra Tyambak Dubeer was appointed as Dubeer in Maharaj's Asth Pradhan Mandal. When Chatrapati Shivaji Maharaj donated the gold equal to his mother Jijabai's weight, he also donated the gold equal to Sonopant Dubeer's weight at Mahabaleshawar. Sonopant Vishwanath Dubeer is the only member to have control over two departments i.e., Dubeer and Shurunavis, once upon a time.
Nyayadhish - Chief Justice, dispensing justice on civil and criminal matters. The post of Nyayadish or Chief Justice was bestowed on Niraji Ravaji, father of Pralhad Niraji.
Panditrao - High Priest, managing internal religious matters. The duties of the Panditrao were to promote learning and in the Ashta Pradhan, known as Senapat or Sarnobat, he was to watch over the interests of his officers. Raghunath Panditrao was given the post Panditrao.

Continued conflict with the Mughal Empire meant that military matters remained exceedingly important to the affairs of the nascent state. Hence, with the notable exception of the priestly Panditrao and the judicial Nyayadisha, the other pradhans held full-time military commands, and their deputies performed their civil duties in their stead. In the later era of the Maratha Empire, these deputies and their staff constituted the core of the Peshwa's bureaucracy.

During Shivaji's rule

After Chatrapati Shivaji Maharaj
Chatrapati Shivaji Maharaj's son Sambhaji, (ruled 1680–89) reduced the powers of the council. Over time, council positions became hereditary, ceremonial positions at court with nominal powers, if any. Beginning 1714 AD, a prime minister appointed by Chatrapati Shivaji's grandson Shahu gradually arrogated power. Within a short period, de facto control of the Maratha state passed to his family. This family of hereditary prime ministers retained the title of Peshwa. However, the Ashta Pradhan council was never revived to fill the functions it discharged for the last decade of Chatrapati Shivaji Maharaj's reign.

Positions Equal to the Ashtapradhan
Chitnis
Also See: Khando Ballal Chitnis
Guptahere
Also see: Bahirji Naik
Phadnavis
 Also see: Nana Fadnavis

Miscellany 
 The Ashta Pradhan is somewhat similar to the court arrangements of other famous emperors such as the Navaratnas of the courts of both Vikramaditya and Akbar, as also of the Astadiggajas of Krishna Deva Raya's court.
Lakshman Sen the ruler of the Sena Empire had Pancharatnas (meaning 5 gems) in his court; one of whom is believed to be Jayadeva, the famous Sanskrit poet and author of Gita Govinda.
 The Ashta Pradhan can be construed as an initiative to develop a second line of leadership in the state akin to the Khalsa by Guru Gobind Singh. Guru Gobind Singh and Chatrapati Shivaji Maharaj were fighting against the Mughal emperor Aurangzeb.

References 

 Ashta Pradhan. (2006). In Encyclopædia Britannica. Retrieved June 18, 2006, from Encyclopædia Britannica Premium Service: 

Maratha Empire
1674 establishments in India